

Events
July 22 – Fabled date of the appearance of the Pied Piper of Hamelin.
December 25 – Geoffrey Chaucer goes abroad on secret state business in the company of Sir John Burley.

Births
Gihwa, Buddhist scholar (died 1433)
Fernán Pérez de Guzmán, Spanish historian and poet (died 1458)

Deaths
None

References

 
Literature
Literature by year